Experimental Remixes is an EP by American punk blues band The Jon Spencer Blues Explosion released in 1995 by Matador Records which consists of six remixes of the group's songs and a hidden bonus track called "Tour Diary". A secondary pressing by Matador increased the length of the "Tour Diary" track to 17 minutes from its original 7 minute length, but the artwork and catalog numbers are identical. Five years after the EP was originally released on Matador, it was reissued by Mute Records in the UK with three additional remixes.

Track listing for 1995 Matador Release 
"Bellbottoms (Old Rascal Mix)" remix by UNKLE
"Flavor Part 1" remix by Beck, Mario Caldato Jr. and Mike D
"Flavor Part 2" remix by Beck, Mario Caldato Jr. and Mike D
"Soul Typecast" remix by Dub Narcotic Sound System
"Greyhound Part 1" remix by Moby
"Greyhound Part 2" remix by GZA, featuring Killah Priest
Bonus track, also known as "Tour Diary"

Track listing for 2000 Mute Release 
"Bellbottoms (Old Rascal Mix)" remix by UNKLE
"Flavor Part 1" remix by Beck, Mario Caldato Jr. and Mike D
"Flavor Part 2" remix by Beck, Mario Caldato Jr. and Mike D
"Soul Typecast" remix by Dub Narcotic Sound System
"Greyhound Part 1" remix by Moby
"Greyhound Part 2" remix by GZA, featuring Killah Priest
"Tour Diary"
"Implosion" remix by MC HyperCRad 
"Explo" remix by John Oswald 
"Blues 'XXX' Man" remix by Prince Paul

References

1995 EPs
Jon Spencer Blues Explosion albums
1995 remix albums
Remix EPs
Matador Records remix albums
Matador Records EPs
Mute Records remix albums
Mute Records EPs